Bad Luck Creek may refer to:

Bad Luck Creek (Alabama)
Bad Luck Creek (Arkansas)
Bad Luck Creek (Idaho County, Idaho)
Bad Luck Creek (Shoshone County, Idaho)
Bad Luck Creek (Montana)
Bad Luck Creek (Texas)